Boxing competitions at the 1979 Pan American Games in San Juan  were held from July 2 to 14 at the Trujillo Alto Coliseum and the Roberto Clemente Coliseum.

Competition schedule
The following was the schedule for the boxing competitions:

Medal table

Medalists

Participating nations
A total of 24 countries have qualified athletes.

See also
Boxing at the 1980 Summer Olympics

References

Amateur Boxing

1979 Pan American Games
Pan American Games
Boxing at the Pan American Games